Basnet/Basnyat is a surname of Khasas of Nepal and India.
It is commonly found among Jharra Chhetri community.

There are five different branches of Basnets in Nepal: 
The Shreepali (Sripali) Jumli Basnets of Jumla bharadwaja later Gorkha.
The Khaptari (Khaptadi Basnyat) King of Khaptad Raghuvanshi Kshatriya Kaushik gotriya 
The Lamichhane; Garga gotriya Basnets

Notable people with surname Basnet

References

Surnames of Nepalese origin
Nepali-language surnames